The Bemidji Curling Club is a curling club located in the city of Bemidji, Minnesota. It is notable for its long line of champions in many competitions, including men's and women's rinks which represented the United States in the 2005 World Curling Championship and the 2006 Winter Olympics in Turin, Italy. Pete Fenson skipped the men's rink, which won the Olympic bronze medal, the first-ever medal in curling for the U.S. Cassandra Johnson skipped the women's rink, which lost to Sweden in the final match of the 2005 World Women's Curling Championship. Another of the club's members, Scott Baird, played as an alternate on the Olympic men's rink. 

The club features a general viewing area on the first floor and another viewing area upstairs with a bar. There is also a kitchen area that is used for when bonspiels and tournaments provide food for the participants. Locker rooms are also provided for men and women. The lockers can be rented by member of the club. There is a store within the club that sells curling equipment. There are six sheets, but often when national championships are being hosted one of the end sheets is used as a viewing area with bleachers. The building also holds a skating rink on the opposite side, separate from the curling club.

History

Near the end of the Great Depression and in the midst of the economic recovery of the New Deal, the Bemidji Curling Club was organized. During the Winter Carnival of 1932, the Hibbing Curling Club put on a demonstration of the sport which not officially organized in Bemidji until a Sunday afternoon meeting at the Tourist Information Building on January 13, 1935.

The first club was located at the Farmer's Market, now the site of the Cenex parking lot located between Second and Third Streets on America Avenue. Henry Krebs donated slabs for enclosing the one sheet of ice and a warming room at one end of the building. The first rocks were purchased from the Chisholm Curling Club at a reduced price. Other rocks were secured through the efforts of Frank Markus as he traveled throughout the area. Rocks could be purchased for about $10 a pair. During these early years, rocks were owned by many of the curlers who made their rocks available to those who did not have their own.

Committees were established and the first draws consisted of fourteen rinks which began their play on January 20, 1935. By February 1935, a total of 16 rinks were formed. There were weekly events which culminated in playing for the Grand Aggregate or the best percentage of wins for the season. Rinks were invited to participate in the Merriam Medal Event in Duluth in 1935. This event was considered to be the State Championship for Minnesota curlers.

During the summer of 1935 a Sports Arena project was approved as one of the first WPA projects for Bemidji. The Arena consisted of a skating and hockey area along with the Curling Club. Curling Club members sold $10 memberships in order to pay for the curling part of the building which was paid in full with the final payment of $500 in January 1936. The arena was located on the old high school property at 7th and America where it remained until 1967.

The first Paul Bunyan Bonspiel was held in January 1937, with 48 entries from around Minnesota and Canada. The John Brodin rink of Eveleth won over the Sam Carroll rink of Hibbing.

During the 1939 season, high school curling was organized with the help of C.W. Vandersluis and H.M. Robbins. Chauncey Prange was the coach. Bemidji won the Minnesota School Boys’ Championship in 1964, ’65, and ’66. Dan Haluptzok skipped the team all three years. Other members were Jon Quistgaard, Bob Fenson, Terry Jackson, Steve Berg, Tom Fenson, and John Doran. After the Minnesota High School League sanctioned curling as a letter sport in 1968, Bemidji teams were runners-up on four occasions until the sport was dropped by the MHSL in 1977.

On January 4, 1949, the roof of the skating side of the arena collapsed from the snow. The skating side had been used to make five extra sheets of ice to accommodate the Paul Bunyan Bonspiel which now had to limit the play from 12-end games to 10-end games.

Women began curling during the two-term presidency of Floyd Hirt (1949–51), and a women's curling club was chartered during the 1951-52 season. The women have sponsored a bonspiel since 1962-63, which became known as the Norma Olson Bonspiel during the 1974-75 season.

In the late 1950s, the club purchased the first matched rocks and installed artificial ice. A few years later, two more sheets were added to the original four sheets.

In 1967, the government bought the property to build Northland Apartments. The club received a sum of money which was supplemented by member donations of $50 to $100 in order to construct the new and present club.

In 1979, due to lack of space and the need for kitchen facilities, a structural addition was made to the club. The addition included the kitchen with serving area and men's and women's locker rooms and some storage area on the lower level. Some remodeling was also done to the existing club.

National and international accomplishments for Bemidji curlers include: 

· In 1979, the Scott Baird rink won the fourth state championship for Bemidji and went on to capture the national title. They participated in the Silver Broom in Switzerland where they finished fifth. The rink included Dan Haluptzok, Mark Haluptzok, and Bob Fenson.

- The same Baird rink advanced to the semifinals of a national playdown for the 1988 Olympics. Rich Reierson, Pete Fenson, Steve Fogelson and Pet Lapp also qualified for the playdown.

- In mixed competition, the Mark Haluptzok rink including Liz Johnson, Tim Johnson and Mary Jo Roufs won the 1980 and 1982 national championships. 

- In 1989, the team of Mark Haluptzok, Dan Haluptzok, Pete Fenson and Bob Fenson competed in the European Challenge for the right to represent the US in Switzerland. They finished second to Steve Brown of Wisconsin in an extra-end playoff game.

- In junior curling, women's team of Kari Liapis, Stacey Liapis, Heidi Rollheiser and Bobbie Breyen placed second in the 1989 national championships and won the 1990 event. They went on to world junior championships, finishing sixth. The junior men's team of Eric Fenson, Shawn Rojeski, Kevin Bergstrom and Ted McCann claimed the national title both in 1991 and 1992. Also in 1992, the junior women's team team of Erika Brown, Kari Liapis, Stacey Liapis, Bobbie Breyen and Debbie Henry claim the national crown, while Andy Borland, Liz Johnson, Tim Johnson and Jean Borland captured the national mixed championship.

- In 1993, Bemidji teams won the US junior women's title (a repeat for Brown's rink) and the US men's championship (Scott Baird, Pete Fenson, Mark Haluptzok and Tim Johnson). The Baird rink defended the title in 1994, when Bemidji also won a national mixed championship (Andy Borland, Liz Johnson, Tim Johnson and Jean Borland). The next year, Risa O’Connell, Missi O’Connell, Natalie Simenson and Alison Naylor won the US junior women's title.

Past National Championships hosted by the club include the 1980 men's nationals, the 1984 mixed nationals and the 1991 junior men's and women's Nationals. The club sponsored the men's and women's national championship in 1996 – the City of Bemidji's centennial year.

External links
Bemidji Curling Club official web site

Curling clubs in the United States
1935 establishments in Minnesota
Bemidji, Minnesota
Curling in Minnesota